The Crouching Beast is a 1935 British war thriller film directed by Victor Hanbury and starring Fritz Kortner, Wynne Gibson and Richard Bird. It was shot at Welwyn Studios with sets designed by the art director Duncan Sutherland. Based on the novel Clubfoot by Valentine Williams, the film was distributed by the Hollywood studio RKO Pictures in order to fulfil its British quota. However it was considerably more expensive than many of the quota quickies produced by American companies during the era.

Plot
In 1915 during the First World War, a British secret agent is killed while stealing secret Turkish plans for the Gallipoli Campaign but manages to pass his information to an American journalist. Travelling to Constantinople she manages to make contact with the British network, but the ruthless head of Turkish intelligence is close on her trail.

Cast
 Fritz Kortner as Ahmed Bey
 Wynne Gibson as Gail Dunbar
 Richard Bird as Nigel Druce
 Andrews Engelmann as Prince Dmitri
 Isabel Jeans as The Pellegrini
 Fred Conyngham as Rudi von Linz
 Peter Gawthorne as Kadir Pasha
 Ian Fleming as Major Abbott
 Marjorie Mars as Ottillie

References

Bibliography
 Low, Rachael. Filmmaking in 1930s Britain. George Allen & Unwin, 1985.
 Wood, Linda. British Films, 1927-1939. British Film Institute, 1986.

External links
 

1935 films
1930s spy drama films
British spy drama films
1930s English-language films
Films directed by Victor Hanbury
Films set in 1915
Films set in Istanbul
World War I spy films
Films based on British novels
Films shot at Welwyn Studios
Films scored by Jack Beaver
Films about the Gallipoli campaign
Films set in the Ottoman Empire
British black-and-white films
British war drama films
1930s war drama films
1935 drama films
1930s British films